Mesonia mobilis is a Gram-negative, strictly aerobic, heterotrophic, chemoorganotrophic and motile bacterium from the genus of Mesonia which has been isolated from seawater.

References

Flavobacteria
Bacteria described in 2006